Freeloaders is a 2012 American ensemble comedy film directed by Dan Rosen, and written by Rosen and singer Dave Gibbs. The film is produced by the Broken Lizard comedy troupe and is independently financed. Freeloaders stars Clifton Collins Jr., Josh Lawson, Kevin Sussman, Zoe Boyle, Nat Faxon, Warren Hutcherson, Jane Seymour, Olivia Munn, Dave Foley, and Counting Crows lead singer Adam Duritz.  It follows a group of friends who find their luxurious lifestyle threatened when the rock star they freeload off decides to sell his home.

Premise
Six slackers who mooch off Counting Crows frontman Adam Duritz and have been crashing at his California mansion for years struggle to maintain their lifestyle when he informs them that he is selling his home. Individually, the friends seek new living arrangements to no avail, so they attempt to prevent the sale of the home altogether, as well as raise money to purchase it.

Cast

Development
Freeloaders was brought to Broken Lizard early into its development, to help gain funding to produce the project. Principal photography was scheduled to begin in January 2009.  As of October 2010, Freeloaders had entered into post-production and was awaiting distribution.  On October 1, 2010, the film was privately screened by Broken Lizard and Duritz at the John Anson Ford Amphitheatre in Los Angeles. On November 3, 2011, Myriad Pictures acquired all distribution rights to the film outside of North America.

References

External links
 
 
 
 

2012 comedy films
2012 films
Broken Lizard
American comedy films
Films set in country houses
2010s English-language films
2010s American films